The following is a list of countries and territories that have sent delegates to Miss Earth since 2001.

Entrants

Unsuccessful attempts to participate 
This is a list of countries that debuted, returned, or the previous countries that supposed to compete in Miss Earth, but never competed due to some reasons of withdrawal.

Notes
  – In 2008, China pressured the organization to change Taiwan's name to Chinese Taipei.
 /Serbia and Montenegro – No longer exist as countries, now competes as Serbia, Montenegro, and the partially recognized Kosovo.

References

External links

Countries
Miss Earth